Jean-François Molinari (born  in Metz, France) is a French-Swiss engineer and scientist specialised in the numerical modeling of the mechanics of materials and structures. He is a full professor and the director of the Computational Solid Mechanics Laboratory at the École Polytechnique Fédérale de Lausanne (EPFL).

Education and career 

Molinari received a B.S. and a M.S. in Mechanical Engineering from the University of Technology of Compiègne in 1997. He received a M.S. in 1997 and a Ph.D. in 2001, both in aeronautics, from the California Institute of Technology. From 2000 to 2005, he was assistant professor in Mechanical Engineering at Johns Hopkins University. He was then associate Research Professor from 2006 to 2011 at the same institution. From 2005 to 2007, he was also a professor at École Normale Supérieure Cachan in Mechanics, and held a Teaching Associate position at the École Polytechnique in Paris from 2006 to 2009.

Molinari started his tenure at EPFL in 2007 as associate Professor in structural mechanics in the School of Architecture, Civil and Environmental Engineering., and was promoted to Full Professor in 2012. He is the director of the Computational Solid Mechanics Laboratory at EPFL. He was director of the EPFL Civil Engineering Institute from 2013 to 2017, and has a joint appointment in the Materials Science institute.

Molinari was elected in October 2019 to the Research Council of the Swiss National Science Foundation in Mathematics, Natural and Engineering Sciences. He is the Chair of the Swiss Community for Computational Methods in Applied Sciences, and a member of the European Solid Mechanics Conference Committee (term of 2016-2021).

Molinari is editor in chief for Elsevier's Journal on Mechanics of Materials.

Research 
Molinari and his laboratory's research focuses on developing multi-scale methods to model and analyse damage mechanics of materials and structures as well as their nano- and micro-structural mechanical properties. The laboratory's research is at the interface between Mechanics, Materials Science, and Scientific Computing, with projects in fundamental and applied science and engineering.

Professor Molinari and his collaborators develop robust, physics-based numerical methods for High Performance Computing. Research activities span mechanisms from the small scale (nanostructured materials, tribology) all the way to large length scales (structural mechanics, earthquake science). A central research theme is friction and fracture, and recent breakthrough research brings a new outlook at traditional engineering wear models.

By modelling the onset of slip between two bodies in frictional contact, Molinari and his collaborators were able to gain insight into the energy balance of earthquakes.

Molinari's laboratory share some of its knowledge by releasing open-source software (molecular dynamics, discrete dislocations, finite elements,   boundary element methods, spectral methods, direct multiscale methods).

Selected publications

Rough contact mechanics

Adhesive wear processes

Friction and fracture

Dynamic Fragmentation

Scientometrics

References

External links 
 
 

1973 births
Living people
Academic staff of the École Polytechnique Fédérale de Lausanne
French engineers